The Transnistria conflict is an ongoing frozen conflict between Moldova and the unrecognized state of Transnistria. Its most active phase was the Transnistria War. There have been several attempts to resolve the conflict, although none have been successful. The conflict may be considered as having started on 2 September 1990, when Transnistria made a formal sovereignty declaration from Moldova (then part of the Soviet Union).

The Transnistria is internationally recognised as a part of Moldova. It obtained diplomatic recognition only from three post-Soviet unrecognized states: Abkhazia, South Ossetia and Artsakh.

Historical status of Transnistria

Until the Second World War 
The Soviet Union in the 1930s had an autonomous region of Transnistria inside Ukraine, called the Moldavian Autonomous Soviet Socialist Republic (MASSR), where nearly half of the population were Romanian-speaking people, and with Tiraspol as its capital.

During World War II, when Romania, aided by Nazi Germany, took control of Transnistria, it did not attempt to annex the occupied territory during the war, although it had plans to do so in the future.

Territorial consequences of the 1992 conflict

Left bank of the Dniester 
During the War of Transnistria, some villages in the central part of Transnistria (on the eastern bank of the Dniester), rebelled against the new separatist Transnistria (PMR) authorities. They have been under effective Moldovan control as a consequence of their rebellion against the PMR. These localities are: commune Cocieri (including village Vasilievca), commune Molovata Nouă (including village Roghi), commune Corjova (including village Mahala), commune Coșnița (including village Pohrebea), commune Pîrîta, and commune Doroțcaia. The village of Corjova is in fact divided between PMR and Moldovan central government areas of control. Roghi is also controlled by the PMR authorities.

Right bank of the Dniester 
At the same time, some areas which are situated on the right bank of the Dniester are under PMR control. These areas consist of the city of Bender with its suburb Proteagailovca, the communes Gîsca, Chițcani (including villages Mereneşti and Zahorna), and the commune of Cremenciug, formally in the Căușeni District, situated south of the city of Bender.

The breakaway PMR authorities also claim the communes of Varnița, in the Anenii Noi District, a northern suburb of Bender, and Copanca, in the Căușeni District, south of Chițcani, but these villages remain under Moldovan control.

Later tensions 
Several disputes have arisen from these cross-river territories. In 2005, PMR Militia entered Vasilievca, which is located over the strategic road linking Tiraspol and Rîbnița, but withdrew after a few days. In 2006 there were tensions around Varnița.  In 2007 there was a confrontation between Moldovan and PMR forces in the Dubăsari-Cocieri area; however, there were no casualties. On 13 May 2007, the mayor of the village of Corjova, which is under Moldovan control, was arrested by the PMR militsia (police) together with a councilor of Moldovan-controlled part of the Dubăsari district.

2022 Russian invasion of Ukraine
Amid the prelude to the 2022 Russian invasion of Ukraine, on 14 January 2022 Ukrainian military intelligence declared that Russian special services were preparing "provocations" against Russian soldiers stationed in Transnistria at the time to create a casus belli for a Russian invasion of Ukraine.

On 24 February, on the first day of the invasion, there were allegations that some rockets that had hit Ukraine had been launched from Transnistria, although Moldova's Ministry of Defense denied this. Later, on 6 March, there were again claims that attacks that had hit Vinnytsia's airport had been launched from Transnistria, although Moldovan officials again denied this and said that they had been launched from Russian ships in the Black Sea.

Amid rumors that Transnistria would attack Ukraine, the President of Transnistria Vadim Krasnoselski declared that Transnistria is a peaceful state which never had any plans to attack its neighbors and that those who spread these allegations were people without control over the situation or provocateurs with malicious intentions. He also made reference to the large ethnically Ukrainian population of Transnistria and how Ukrainian is taught in Transnistrian schools and is one of the official languages of the republic. However, in March, an image of the President of Belarus Alexander Lukashenko standing in front of a battle plan map of the invasion of Ukraine was leaked. This map showed a supposed incursion of Russian troops from the Ukrainian city port of Odesa into Transnistria and Moldova, revealing that Transnistria could get posteriorly involved in the war.

On 22 April 2022, Russia's Brigadier General Rustam Minnekayev in a defence ministry meeting said that Russia planned to extend its Mykolayiv–Odesa front in the Ukraine war further west to include the Transnistria on the Ukrainian border with Moldova.  Minnekaev announced that the plan of Russia's military action in Ukraine included taking full control of Southern Ukraine and achieving a land corridor to Transnistria. He also talked about the existence of supposed evidence of "oppression of the Russian-speaking population" of Transnistria, echoing Russia's justifications for the war in Ukraine.   The Ministry of Defence of Ukraine described this intention as imperialism, saying that it contradicted previous Russian claims that it did not have territorial ambitions in Ukraine".

On 26 April, Ukrainian presidential adviser Oleksiy Arestovych said during an interview that Moldova was a close neighbor to Ukraine, that Ukraine was not indifferent to it and that Moldova could turn to Ukraine for help. He also declared that Ukraine was able to solve the problem of Transnistria "in the blink of an eye", but only if Moldovan authorities requested the country's help; and that Romania could also come to Moldova's aid as "they are in fact the same people", with the same language as he continued, even though "there are many Moldovans who would not agree with me". Moldova officially let down this suggestion from Ukraine, expressing its support only for a peaceful outcome of the conflict.

Position of the PMR government advocates

According to PMR advocates, the territory to the east of the Dniester River never belonged either to Romania, nor to its predecessors, such as the Principality of Moldavia. This territory was split off from the Ukrainian SSR in a political maneuver of the USSR to become a seed of the Moldavian SSR (in a manner similar to the creation of the Karelo-Finnish SSR). In 1990, the Pridnestrovian Moldavian SSR was proclaimed in the region by a number of conservative local Soviet officials opposed to perestroika. This action was immediately declared void by the then General Secretary of the Communist Party of the Soviet Union Mikhail Gorbachev.

At the dissolution of the Soviet Union in 1991, Moldova became independent. The Moldovan Declaration of Independence denounced the Molotov–Ribbentrop Pact and declared the 2 August 1940 "Law of the USSR on the establishment of the Moldavian SSR"  null and void. The PMR side argues that, since this law was the only legislative document binding Transnistria to Moldova, there is neither historical nor legal basis for Moldova's claims over the territories on the left bank of the Dniester. 

A 2010, study conducted by the University of Colorado Boulder showed that the majority of Transnistria's population supports the country's separation from Moldova. According to the study, more than 80% of ethnic Russians and Ukrainians, and 60% of ethnic Moldovans in Transnistria preferred independence or annexation by Russia rather than reunification with Moldova.

In 2006, officials of the country decided to hold a referendum to determine the status of Transnistria. There were two statements on the ballot:  the first one was, "Renunciation of independence and potential future integration into Moldova"; the second was, "Independence and potential future integration into Russia". The results of this double referendum were that a large section of the population was against the first statement (96.61%) and in favor of the second one (98.07%).

Moldovan position
Moldova lost de facto control of Transnistria in 1992, in the wake of the War of Transnistria. However, the Republic of Moldova considers itself the rightful successor state to the Moldavian SSR (which was guaranteed the right to secession from the Soviet Union under the last version of the Soviet Constitution). By the principle of territorial integrity, Moldova claims that any form of secession from the state without the consent of the central Moldovan government is illegal. The Moldavian side hence believes that its position is backed by international law.

It considers the current Transnistria-based PMR government to be illegitimate and not the rightful representative of the region's population, which has a Moldovan plurality (39.9% as of 1989). The Moldovan side insists that Transnistria cannot exist as an independent political entity and must be reintegrated into Moldova.

According to Moldovan sources, the political climate in Transnistria does not allow the free expression of the will of the people of the region and supporters of reintegration of Transnistria in Moldova are subjected to harassment, arbitrary arrests and other types of intimidation from separatist authorities.

Because of the non-recognition of Transnistria's independence, Moldova believes that all inhabitants of Transnistria are legally speaking, citizens of Moldova. However, it is estimated that 60,000 to 80,000 inhabitants of Transnistria acquired Russian citizenship and around 20,000 Transnistrians have acquired Ukrainian citizenship. As a result, Moldovan authorities have tried to block the installation of a Russian and Ukrainian consulate in Tiraspol.

International recognition of the sovereignty of Transnistria
Only three polities recognize Transnistria's sovereignty, which are themselves largely unrecognized states: Abkhazia, South Ossetia and Artsakh. All four states are members of the Community for Democracy and Rights of Nations.

On 21 February 2023, Russian president Vladimir Putin revoked the foreign policy document that declared Russian commitment to Moldovan sovereignty in the context of the Transnistria conflict.

United Nations Resolution A/72/L.58

On 22 June 2018, the Republic of Moldova submitted a UN resolution that calls for "Complete and unconditional withdrawal of foreign military forces from the territory of the Republic of Moldova, including Transnistria." The resolution was adopted by a simple majority.

See also
 Four Pillars of Transnistria
 War of Transnistria
 2006 Transnistrian customs crisis
 International recognition of Transnistria
 Foreign relations of Transnistria
 Abkhaz–Georgian conflict
 Georgian–Ossetian conflict
 Nagorno-Karabakh conflict

References

Bibliography

External links
Transnistrian side

 History of creation and development of the Parliament of the Pridnestrovian Moldavian Republic (PMR)

Moldovan side

 EuroJournal.org's Transnistria category
 Trilateral Plan for Solving the Transnistrian Issue (developed by Moldova-Ukraine-Romania expert group)

Others

International organizations

 OSCE Mission to Moldova: Conflict resolution and negotiation category
 Marius Vahl and Michael Emerson, "Moldova and the Transnistrian Conflict" (pdf) in "Europeanization and Conflict Resolution: Case Studies from the European Periphery", JEMIE – Journal on Ethnopolitics and Minority Issues in Europe, 1/2004, Ghent, Belgium
 Research on the European Union and the conflict in Transnistria 
 New York City Bar: Russia’s Activities in Moldova Violate International Law

Ukrainian side

 The Plan for the Transnistrian Conflict Settlement Proposed by Ukraine

Romanian side

 

History of Moldova since 1991
History of Transnistria since 1991
Moldova–Russia relations
 
Post-Soviet conflicts
Politics of Transnistria
Politics of Moldova
Wars involving Moldova
Wars involving Russia
20th-century conflicts
21st-century conflicts
1990s conflicts
2000s conflicts
2010s conflicts
2020s conflicts